Kiashahr Rural District is a rural district (dehestan) in Kiashahr District, Astaneh-ye Ashrafiyeh County, Gilan Province, Iran. At the 2006 census, its population was 10,340, in 3,083 families. The rural district has 15 villages.

References 

Rural Districts of Gilan Province
Astaneh-ye Ashrafiyeh County